Komsomolsky is a rural locality (a selo) in Rassvetovsky Selsoviet, Davlekanovsky District, Bashkortostan, Russia. The population was 259 as of 2010. There are 5 streets.

Geography 
Komsomolsky is located 9 km northwest of Davlekanovo (the district's administrative centre) by road. Doroshevka is the nearest rural locality.

References 

Rural localities in Davlekanovsky District